NGC 4145 is a barred spiral galaxy located in the Ursa Major galaxy cluster, 68 million light years from the Earth. The galaxy has little star formation, except on its outer edges. Due to the loss of energy that occurs without star formation, some astronomers predict that the galaxy will degenerate into a lenticular galaxy in the near future. However, the galaxy's interaction with NGC 4151 may "maintain [its] star formation".

References

External links
 

4145
Barred spiral galaxies
Ursa Major Cluster
Canes Venatici
038693